L-655,708 (FG-8094) is a nootropic drug invented in 1996 by a team working for Merck, Sharp and Dohme, that was the first compound developed which acts as a subtype-selective inverse agonist at the α5 subtype of the benzodiazepine binding site on the GABAA receptor. It acts as an inverse agonist at the α1, α2, α3 and α5 subtypes, but with much higher affinity for α5, and unlike newer α5 inverse agonists such as α5IA, L-655,708 exerts its subtype selectivity purely via higher binding affinity for this receptor subtype, with its efficacy as an inverse agonist being around the same at all the subtypes it binds to.

A radiolabelled form of L-655,708 was used to map the distribution of the GABAA α5 subtype in the brain, and it was found to be expressed predominantly in the hippocampus, an area of the brain involved with learning and memory. Activation of this subtype is thought to be largely responsible for producing the cognitive side effects displayed by many benzodiazepine and nonbenzodiazepine drugs, such as amnesia and difficulties with learning and memory, and so this led researchers to conclude that a drug acting as an inverse agonist at this subtype should have the opposite effect and enhance learning and memory.

L-655,708 was indeed found to produce improved cognitive performance in animal studies, without producing the side effect of convulsions which is produced by non-selective inverse agonists like DMCM. However it was found to be anxiogenic at doses which enhanced cognition, most likely because of its inverse agonist effects on other subtypes such as α2 and α3, making it unlikely that this drug would be suitable for use as a nootropic in humans. Still, L-655,708 may find use in the clinic to combat postoperative cognitive dysfunction since administration of sub-nootropic doses of L-655,708 prevented persistent memory impairment in mice anesthetized with isoflurane.

A study from 2015 found that L-655,708, and another α5 subunit-containing GABAA receptor-selective negative allosteric modulator, MRK-016, produced rapid, ketamine-like antidepressant effects in animal models of depression.

See also 
 GABAA receptor negative allosteric modulator
 GABAA receptor § Ligands

References 

Anxiogenics
Carboxylate esters
GABAA receptor negative allosteric modulators
Imidazopyrrolobenzodiazepines
Lactams
Nootropics
Phenol ethers